Cyclone Grant was a tropical cyclone that affected Queensland and the Northern Territory in late December 2011 and early January 2012.

Meteorological history

Tropical Low 04U developed into a Category 1 tropical cyclone on the morning of 25 December and moved slowly towards the Cobourg Peninsula. The system reached Category 2 strength in the afternoon of 25 December. In the evening of 28 December the system, downgraded to a tropical low, moved back onto the waters of the Gulf of Carpentaria. The system continued to move eastward across the Cape York Peninsula and into the Coral Sea, even as the storm weakened, until Grant underwent an extratropical transition on 2 January 2012. Later on the same day, the extratropical remnant of Grant dissipated.

Preparations and impact

Northern Territory
A gale warning was issued for Darwin and the Tiwi Islands on 24 December. The system intensified on 25 December, reaching Category 2 status in the afternoon, and a cyclone watch was declared between Dundee Beach and Nhulunbuy, with a cyclone warning issued for areas between Cape Fourcroy and Milingimbi including the Tiwi Islands. The system crossed Van Diemen Gulf and made a second landfall east of Point Stuart in the early morning of 26 December. Shortly thereafter the cyclone was downgraded to Category 1, and by that afternoon it was downgraded to a tropical low as it passed Jabiru in Kakadu National Park. Jabiru Airport had received  of rain by 9:00am on 26 December. On 27 December the system was moving slowly south-east across Arnhem Land, causing heavy rainfall. Ediths Fall Ridge recorded  of rainfall, which produced damaging flooding. A cyclone watch was issued on 27 December from Nhulunbuy to Numbalwar, including Groote Eylandt.

Flooding associated with the system in the Katherine area cut off the Stuart Highway, washed cars off bridges and derailed a train. The Adelaide–Darwin railway was severely damaged by the derailment of the Genesee & Wyoming freight train. The Ghan was forced to stop with 200 passengers in Katherine. One week after the cyclone had passed freight companies were poised to raise transportation costs as shipping to Darwin would need to be done by road. The railway between Katherine and Darwin would be out of service until the end of January 2012.

On 28 December the system moved eastward, bringing with it heavy rainfall to the Roper-McArthur River districts.

Queensland
A cyclone watch was issued for Queensland for coastal areas from Thursday Island to Gilbert River Mouth but was later cancelled when the system did not re-intensify to Category 1 strength. Late on 29 December the system as a tropical monsoon low was northwest of Pormpuraaw on the Cape York Peninsula before making landfall in the early morning of 30 December south of Wiepa near the aboriginal community of Aurukun. A severe weather warning was issued for the Peninsula, North Tropical Coast and Gulf Country districts.
Later on 30 December the monsoon low passed Coen and out into the waters of the Coral Sea.

References

External links
Joint Typhoon Warning Centre (JTWC) .
Australian Bureau of Meteorology (TCWC's Perth, Darwin & Brisbane) .
Tropical Cyclone Warning Centre Jakarta.

2011–12 Australian region cyclone season
Category 2 Australian region cyclones
Grant
Grant